The 2007 Liga Indonesia First Division is the 13th edition of Liga Indonesia First Division, second-tier competition in Indonesian football.

First stage

Region I

Region II

Region III

Region IV

Championship play-off

References

Liga Indonesia First Division seasons
1
1
Indonesia
Indonesia